Downlands may refer to:

 Downland, an area of open chalk hills, especially in southern England
 Downlands College, a school in Queensland, Australia
 Downlands Community School in West Sussex, England